The federal city of Saint Petersburg, Russia, is divided into eighteen rayony ("districts", singular: rayon), which are in turn subdivided into municipal okrugs, municipal towns, and municipal settlements.

Admiralteysky District

Frunzensky District

Kalininsky District

Kirovsky District

Kolpinsky District

Krasnogvardeysky District

Krasnoselsky District

Kronshtadtsky District

Kurortny District

Moskovsky District

Nevsky District

Petrodvortsovy District

Petrogradsky District

Primorsky District

Pushkinsky District

Tsentralny District

Vasileostrovsky District

Vyborgsky District

References

Notes

Sources

See also
Saint Petersburg City Administration

 
Saint Petersburg